The Women's Masters Basel (formerly the RE/MAX Women's Masters Basel and the Credit Suisse Women's Masters Basel) is an annual bonspiel, or curling tournament, that takes place at the Curlingzentrum Region Basel in Arlesheim, Switzerland. The tournament is held in a round-robin format. The tournament has been a part of the World Curling Tour since 2006.

Event names
2006: Women's Masters Basel
2007–2010: RE/MAX Women's Masters Basel
2011: Credit Suisse Women's Masters Basel
2012–2022: Women's Masters Basel

Past champions

References

External links
Home Page

Women's World Curling Tour events
Credit Suisse
Women's Masters Basel
Sports competitions in Basel
Champions Curling Tour events
Arlesheim